Athrips asarinella is a moth of the family Gelechiidae. It is found in France.

The larvae feed on Antirrhinum asarina.

References

Moths described in 1930
Athrips
Moths of Europe